Ae Dil Hai Mushkil is a 2016 Indian Hindi-language musical romantic drama film directed, produced and written by Karan Johar under his banner Dharma Productions. The film stars Ranbir Kapoor, Anushka Sharma and Aishwarya Rai Bachchan.

Ae Dil Hai Mushkil released worldwide on 28 October 2016 coinciding with the festival of Diwali. The film's soundtrack composed by Pritam was an instant blockbuster, thus enhancing its hype, with lyrics written by Amitabh Bhattacharya and songs sung by Arijit Singh. Despite having clashed with Ajay Devgn's Shivaay, it went on to gross  worldwide. The film proved to be one of the year's top-grossing films in domestic and overseas markets. It received mixed-to-positive reviews from critics upon release, with praise for its direction, music, cinematography, and performances of the cast, with particular praise directed towards Sharma, Kapoor and Rai’s performances.

At the 62nd Filmfare Awards, Ae Dil Hai Mushkil received a leading 9 nominations (tying with Udta Punjab), including Best Film, Best Director (Johar), Best Actress (Sharma) and Best Actor (Kapoor), and won 4 awards, including Best Music Director (Pritam), Best Lyricist (Bhattacharya for "Channa Mereya") and Best Male Playback Singer (Arijit Singh for "Ae Dil Hai Mushkil").

Plot 
The film begins with the interview of Ayan Sanger, a singer who has newly acquired fame with his non-filmy songs. He tells the story of his experience of love in a flashback. A few years ago, in London, a chance meeting in a disco between Ayan and Alizeh happens and they hook up with each other. They get to know about each other and become friends. Later, when they discover their respective partners are cheating on them, they break up with their lovers: Ayan with Lisa D'Souza and Alizeh with "Dr." Faisal Khan and the two go to Paris to spend a week together. Aayan falls in love with Alizeh but does not tell her while she considers him to be only a "friend". One day, Alizeh stumbles upon DJ Ali, her ex-boyfriend/lover, who wants to reconcile. Partially confused, but still in love with him, Alizeh decides to go with DJ Ali, and so unintentionally stops hanging out with Ayan and they cease communication.

A few days later, Alizeh calls and invites Ayan to her wedding with DJ Ali in Lucknow. Ayan is shaken on hearing this but reluctantly agrees to the invitation. At the wedding, he tells Alizeh he loves her but she rejects his feelings causing Ayan to leave the ceremony heartbroken. At the airport to board a flight to Dubai, he meets Saba Taliyar Khan, a poet, who is leaving for Vienna. She consoles Ayan and gives him a book with her poetry and number on it. Ayan reads that poetry and is moved by it. He calls her after three months stating that he is in Vienna and wants to meet her. They meet. He learns that Saba is divorced and has no place for love in her heart. They get into a relationship. Later, at an art gallery, he meets Saba's ex-husband, Tahir Taliyar Khan, who tells him that one-sided love is not a weakness but rather empowering as it isn't shared as one doesn't even need the presence of the person one is in love with to keep loving them regardless. Ayan, who had blocked Alizeh from contacting him in all ways, finally calls and reconnects with her on being inspired by these words. Alizeh feels really happy and tells him that she missed their friendship. He begins to send pictures of Saba to her to try and induce jealousy while Alizeh tells him about her happy life with Ali and assumes that he has moved on.

After a few days, Alizeh informs Ayan that she is coming to Vienna and wants to meet him. Ayan invites her for dinner with Saba to provoke Alizeh and make her feel jealous which Saba notices. Before she leaves, Ayan confronts her that she has no feelings and is heartless. Alizeh says that she does love Ayan but not in a romantic way. They have a verbal fight and then he walks away. He goes to Saba, who hugs Ayan one last time and tells him that she really started loving him and that before it gets more intense, they should part their ways. She fears that she will get hurt realizing that she will never get the love she saw in Ayan's eyes for Alizeh. Their relationship ends and Ayan leaves.

Ayan continues to harbour love for Alizeh and becomes a famous singer with his channel. He meets Ali one day and realizes that Ali and Alizeh are no longer together. Ali tells Ayan that even though Alizeh loved him, she was not able to get the love she thought she deserved. Ayan, concerned, goes to Alizeh's favourite spot and waits for two days there, hoping that she arrives. Alizeh meets him there and tells Ayan that she is diagnosed with stage four cancer and will not live much longer. Ayan is heartbroken but they try to make the best of their time together. Ayan tries to make Alizeh love him, to no avail. This leads to a fight between the two, and Alizeh decides to leave Ayan as he cannot understand that she cannot fake her feelings for Ayan just to make him feel happy. Next morning Ayan tries to search for Alizeh, apparently reaching the airport and thus fulfilling her last wish also before death. Eventually, Ayan makes peace with the fact that he and Alizeh can at least be friends and nothing more. The screen blacks out and comes back to the present where Ayan, still a popular singer, is giving an interview based on the love of his life. Ayan sings the song "Channa Mereya", which is inspired by his one-sided love story, and finishes the interview.

Cast 
Ranbir Kapoor as Ayan Sanger
Anushka Sharma as Alizeh Khan
Aishwarya Rai Bachchan as Saba Taliyar Khan

Guest Appearances
Shah Rukh Khan as Tahir Taliyar Khan
Lisa Haydon as Lisa D'Souza
Fawad Khan as DJ Ali 
Imran Abbas as Dr. Faisal Khan
Alia Bhatt as DJ in "The Breakup Song"
Neha Dhupia as Ayan's interviewer (voiceover)

Production

Development 

Ae Dil Hai Mushkil was first announced in November 2014. At the time, writer-director Karan Johar, who had previously helmed Student of the Year (2012), said that for the past year and a half, he had been developing a story that he needed to work on for several months. However, while he was in New York, the idea for Ae Dil Hai Mushkil (named after a song from the 1956 film C.I.D. starring Dev Anand and Waheeda Rehman) came to him and he wrote the screenplay in 30 days. When he came back to India, he spoke to the three lead actors and they all signed on immediately. 

Johar stated that he was motivated to cast Ranbir Kapoor and Anushka Sharma in the film after getting to know them as a co-star in Anurag Kashyap's Bombay Velvet (2015), which marked Johar's leading screen debut. 

Johar added that he was excited to cast Aishwarya Rai Bachchan after several unsuccessful attempts to cast her in his previous films Kuch Kuch Hota Hai (1998), Kabhi Khushi Kabhie Gham... (2001), Kal Ho Naa Ho (2003) and Kabhi Alvida Naa Kehna (2006).

Fawad Khan, who had recently appeared in Johar-produced Kapoor & Sons (2016), was cast to play the role of a DJ, described as "not exactly a cameo as it becomes a backbone for a certain conflict of a character" in the film. 

Lisa Haydon also confirmed that she will appear in the film. At the Toronto International Film Festival in September 2016, Johar confirmed that Shah Rukh Khan had also filmed a scene for the film.

On 6 February at the India Conference at Harvard, Johar revealed that in the film, Kapoor plays the character of a Hindu boy named Ayan, and Sharma plays a Muslim girl named Alizeh.

Filming 
Principal photography began in September 2015 with Sharma and Kapoor in London. At the end of September, the team filmed some portions in Paris. In October, they began shooting in various locations in Austria, including the city of Vienna. Rai Bachchan joined the crew in Vienna in mid-October after the release of her film Jazbaa (2015). In March 2016, Kapoor, Sharma, and Khan were seen filming in Mandawa, Rajasthan. In July 2016, Johar tweeted a photo of Kapoor and Sharma on set in Mumbai for the last schedule.

Soundtrack

Release

Screening issue 
On 8 October 2016, the Indian political party, Maharashtra Navnirman Sena (MNS), proclaimed that they would not allow the release of the film, following nationwide protests surrounding the terrorist attack in Jammu and Kashmir on 18 September 2016 and the decision by Cinema Owners Exhibitors Association of India preventing the release of films with Pakistani actors in four states – Maharashtra, Gujarat, Karnataka, and Goa. Citing the casting of Pakistani actor Fawad Khan in the film, the MNS warned theater owners around the country to not screen the film, threatening them with vandalism. Announcing that security will be tightened at theaters along with sufficient police protection, Maharashtra chief minister, Devendra Fadnavis, commented on the issue, saying, "Anyone found taking the law into their hands will be dealt with firmly." He also informed that 12 MNS members were sent to judicial custody after they barged into a Mumbai theater and held a protest on 19 October 2016.

Commenting on the ruckus behind his film's release, Johar released a video stating that the circumstances in which the film was shot in 2015 were completely different. "Going forward, I would like to say that of course, I will not engage with talent from the neighbouring country, given the circumstance. But with that same energy, I beseech you to know one thing – that over 300 people in my Indian crew have put their blood, sweat, and tears into making my film, Ae Dil Hai Mushkil. I don't think it's fair for them to face any kind of turbulence on account of other fellow Indians," he further added in a video statement. He was heavily criticized by the news and social media for buckling under pressure. However, people from the film fraternity like Mukesh Bhatt and Shyam Benegal supported Johar and his film, and requested the people to consider the film and its release without giving importance to the actors' nationalities.

On 20 October 2016, Mukesh Bhatt said that his discussion with the Union home minister, Rajnath Singh, had been consequential, and affirmed that the film will be screened throughout the country without any violence. However, he promised that he would not make any more films with Pakistani actors.

Reception

Box office
Ae Dil Hai Mushkil was made on a total budget of over 50 crore, including marketing and distribution costs. Prior to its release, the film had already recouped 75 crore ($11.2 million) from music, satellite and digital rights, so it needed to recover only 25 crore ($3.7 million) from the domestic box office. Worldwide, the film earned ₹90.84 crore ($13.6 million) on its opening weekend, while ComScore reported an estimated $12.8 million from 14 markets. As of November, it has made $21.3 million worldwide.

In India, its domestic market, the film had to compete with Shivaay which was released on the same day during the lucrative Diwali weekend. On its opening day, the film made 13.30 crore, the third biggest for both Sharma and Kapoor, and the sixth biggest for a Bollywood film of the year. Through its opening weekend, it scored a debut of 35.60 crore ($5.3 million) net in its three days on 3,200 screens, equating to a gross 49.84 crore ($7.65 million), the ninth-biggest debut of the year and the best ever debut for Johar, beating My Name is Khans ₹315.0 million ($4.7 million). On Monday, it saw a hike in ticket sales, earning 17.75 crore ($2.65 million) due to the holiday season. In its first full week, the film earned ₹801.9 million ($12 million) in India alone and $20.2 million worldwide. The film continued to dominate the box office in its second weekend, earning $3.2 million from 2,000 screens (−1,200 screens). In just 10 days, the film earned 97.17 crore ($14.6 million) net and has become the sixth highest-grossing Bollywood film in India. Moreover, the film now ranks as the highest-earner for Rai Bachchan, beating Dhoom 2s 82.30 crore ($12.3 million) in 2006; the fourth biggest for Sharma as well as for Kapoor.

In the United Kingdom, it recorded the biggest Bollywood opening of the year with ₹4.88 crore ($772,891), debuting at eighth place at the U.K. box office. However, this is inclusive of previews. Including previews, Sultan would be the clear winner with a $1.3 million debut in July. But excluding previews, Ae Dil Hai Mushkil is ahead of the former. In the United States and Canada, the film received a limited release across 302 theaters and grossed 14 crore ($2.13 million) in its opening weekend finishing in tenth place.

By the end of its theatrical run, the film grossed 160.69 crore in India and 237.56 crore worldwide, thus becoming a blockbuster at the box office..

Critical response
Ae Dil Hai Mushkil received mixed-to-positive reviews from critics upon release, with praise for its direction, music, cinematography, and performances of the cast, with particular praise directed towards Sharma, Kapoor and Rai’s performances; while its story and screenplay received criticism.

Rotten Tomatoes gives the film a 53% score based on 14 critic reviews, with an average rating of 5.4/10. On Metacritic, which assigns a normalized rating, the film has a score of 40 out of 100, based on four critics, indicating "mixed or average reviews".

Bollywood Hungama gave 4/5 ratings and commented, "a contemporary and a progressive take on relationships from the master storyteller Karan Johar".

Raja Sen and Sukanya Verma of Rediff.com respectively rated 4/5 and 3.5/5 and said, "Thank you, Karan Johar for this film feels like a sob. Johar has improved massively as a storyteller, this film is more polished and assured than anything he's done before." and, "As evident by his body of work, Karan Johar has a sweet spot for this attribute, in the splendidly romantic and richly satisfying Ae Dil Hai Mushkil."

Nihit Bhave of The Times of India rated 3.5/5 and said, "a beautiful-looking film that isn't bereft of logic".

Rajeev Masand of News 18 gave the film 3.5 out of 5 stars and said, "Despite the occasionally mawkish undertones and the blatant attempt at emotional manipulation in its final act, Ae Dil Hai Mushkil gives you a hero that makes you care. I suspect you’ll be a slobbering mess at the end of the film, a puddle of tears when the lights come back on. Johar knows how to do that. It's a skill that's stayed with him even if his grammar has changed."

Subhash K. Jha of Deccan Chronicle rated 2.5/5 and said, "Ae Dil Hai Mushkil is one good looking film with actors who epitomize human beauty." Sweta Kaushal of Hindustan Times rated 2.5/5, saying "Ae Dil Hai Mushkil offers little in terms of story and fails to get the audience empathize or feel for the characters and events in the movie."

Shubhra Gupta of The Indian Express rated 2/5 and said, "Johar is unable to go the extra mile, hope that Johar will come up with something newer and sharper the next time around." Mike McCahill of The Guardian rated 2/5 and said, "Despite controversy over the casting, Karan Johar's romance has a failure of nerve about Hindu-Muslim relations."

The Hindu commented, "Ae Dil Hai Mushkil is the latest in the brand of cinema that isn't so much as plot driven as it is focused on characters, relationships, and interactions."

Reuters commented, "Ae Dil Hai Mushkil has neither gravitas nor the charm to be worth remembering."

Accolades

References

External links 

2016 films
Films featuring songs by Pritam
Indian romantic drama films
2016 romantic drama films
Films directed by Karan Johar
Indian romantic musical films
2010s romantic musical films
2010s Hindi-language films
Films set in Lucknow
Films set in London
Films shot in Mandawa
Fox Star Studios films
Hindi-language romance films